Varvandi-ye Kuchak (also Romanized as Varvandī-ye Kūchak and Varūndī-ye Kūchak) is a village in Beyranvand-e Jonubi Rural District, Bayravand District, Khorramabad County, Lorestan Province, Iran. At the 2006 census, its population was 56, in 12 families.

References 

Towns and villages in Khorramabad County